Dennis E Pollard (born 1934), is a male former boxer who competed for England.

Boxing career
He represented England in the 81 kg light-heavyweight division at the 1962 British Empire and Commonwealth Games in Perth, Western Australia.

He was a member of the Metropolitan Police and Fitzroy Lodge Amateur Boxing Club.

Personal life
He was a policeman by trade.

References

1934 births
English male boxers
Boxers at the 1962 British Empire and Commonwealth Games
Living people
Light-heavyweight boxers
Commonwealth Games competitors for England